Felice is a 1971 short silent film that explores the difficult but passionate relationship between a younger man and older woman through a cascading crescendo of non-linear, interwoven scenes and sequences.  Running time:  seven minutes.  Winner of the 1972 Oklahoma State University Film Festival Award, with Hollywood judges that included actor G.D. Spradlin, and writers/producers Joe Byrne, and Jeb Rosenbook.

It was written, produced, directed and edited by Sharron Miller and stars Dixie Tymitz and David Payne. Its music was composed by Evan Tonsing.

See also
 List of American films of 1971

External links
 

1971 films
American silent short films
American black-and-white films
Films directed by Sharron Miller
1970s American films